Diego Iván Pineda Juárez (born 8 April 1995) is a Mexican professional footballer who plays as a forward.

Honours
Morelia
Liga de Expansión MX: Clausura 2022

Mexico U20
CONCACAF U-20 Championship: 2015

References

External links
 
 

Living people
1995 births
Mexico under-20 international footballers
Association football forwards
Club América footballers
Venados F.C. players
Atlético Morelia players
Atlético San Luis footballers
Liga MX players
Ascenso MX players
Liga Premier de México players
2015 CONCACAF U-20 Championship players
Footballers from San Luis Potosí
People from San Luis Potosí City
Mexican footballers